Kissin Time is the 16th studio album by British singer Marianne Faithfull.

Overview 

After turns as a neo-cabaret/slow ballad crooner in previous works (represented by her 1990s works with Hal Willner, Angelo Badalamenti and the interpretation of Brecht/Weill standards), Faithfull was eager to collaborate with contemporary musicians. She co-wrote almost all the songs, and worked with several notable musicians who produced the tracks.

The song "Kissin Time" is the result of a collaboration between her and Blur, and is, according to Faithfull, "sort of about Damon (Albarn) and sort of about me." Beck, who worked with her in Los Angeles, is responsible for the tracks "Sex With Strangers", "Like Being Born" and "Nobody's Fault". While the first one is an electro-funk sprechstimme track, influenced by Serge Gainsbourg and Beck's Midnite Vultures, the other two tend to a more folk/country/Leonard Cohen path.  'Nobody's Fault' previously appeared on Beck's album Mutations under the title "Nobody's Fault but My Own" in 1999. Beck's collaborations were co-produced by Tony Hoffer.

"The Pleasure Song", which was included on the soundtrack of the cable television series The L Word, was written in Paris with Les Valentines (the duo Edith Fambuena and Jean Louis Pierot) and French singer Étienne Daho. Billy Corgan contributed to three songs: the reworking of the 1960s Goffin/King success "Something Good", the hymnal and synth-layered "I'm On Fire", and the reflective acoustic pop of "Wherever I Go", about which Faithfull declared "that's Billy trying to sit down and write Marianne a hit."

The "Song For Nico" was written by Faithfull and Dave Stewart after reading a biography of the German singer/songwriter/actress/model, who Faithfull identified with even though, as she said, "Nico had tremendous injustice in her life, and I've had tremendous luck." The singer also declared that this tune "is one of the best things I've ever written."

About the biographical "Sliding Through Life on Charm", Faithfull said, "I'd been trying to write this song for 20 years, always getting stuck because I couldn't find a fucking rhyme. And I thought, when I see that Jarvis Cocker — so I grabbed him in this television studio one day and said 'Now, look, I want you to take this title and go and write a song from it'. And off he went. And then he took another year and a half before I got it — and then it took another year and a half before I understood it enough to record it."

Track listing
 "Sex with Strangers" (Marianne Faithfull, Beck) – 4:21 -- featuring Beck
 "The Pleasure Song" (Marianne Faithfull, Étienne Daho, Edith Fambuena, Jean Louis Pierot) – 4:15
 "Like Being Born" (Marianne Faithfull, Beck) – 3:51 -- featuring Beck and Jon Brion
 "I'm on Fire" (Marianne Faithfull, Billy Corgan) – 5:11 -- featuring Billy Corgan
 "Wherever I Go" (Billy Corgan) – 4:27  -- featuring Billy Corgan
 "Song for Nico" (Marianne Faithfull, Dave Stewart) – 3:59 -- featuring Dave Stewart
 "Sliding Through Life on Charm" (Marianne Faithfull, Pulp) – 4:00 -- featuring Pulp
 "Love & Money" (Marianne Faithfull, David Courts) – 2:17
 "Nobody's Fault" (Beck) – 6:28 -- featuring Beck
 "Kissin Time" (Marianne Faithfull, Blur) – 5:39 -- featuring Blur
 "Something Good" (Carole King, Gerry Goffin) – 3:24 -- featuring Billy Corgan

Bonus Track (Japan Edition)
 "Sex with Strangers" (Sly & Robbie Sex Ref Mix) - 4:57

Bonus Disc (French Editions)
 "Blood In My Eyes" (Traditional)

Production credits
Marianne Faithfull - vocals, backing vocals, synthesizer, percussion, hand-clapping
Beck - producer, programming, guitar, synthesizer, percussion, backing vocals
Tony Hoffer - producer, programming, engineer, mixing
Justin Meldal-Johnsen - bass on "Sex With Strangers"
Jon Brion - celeste, drums, Chamberlain, harmonium
Smokey Hormel - guitar
Étienne Daho - producer
Edith Fambuena - producer, guitar
Jean Louis Pierot - producer, keyboards
David A. Stewart - producer, bass, guitar
Billy Corgan - producer, bass, guitar, keyboards, programming, backing vocals, engineer, mixing
Shawn Christopher - backing vocals on "I'm On Fire"
Paris Delane - backing vocals on "I'm On Fire"
Matt Walker - drums
Ben Hillier - producer, engineer, mixing, hand-clapping
Barry Reynolds - producer, bass, guitar, programming, mixing
Ned Douglas - keyboards, programming
Mark Price - drums
Bertrand "Mako" Blais - programming
Gavin Skinner - drums
Blur:
Damon Albarn - guitar, keyboards, backing vocals, hand-clapping
Graham Coxon - guitar
Alex James - bass, hand-clapping
Dave Rowntree - drums, hand-clapping
Pulp:
Jarvis Cocker - producer, keyboards
Steve Mackey - producer, bass
Mark Webber - guitar
Nick Banks - drums
Technical
Howard Willing - pre-production
Clive Goddard - engineer, mixing
Bjorn Thorsrud - engineer, mixing
Nick Addison - engineer
Jean-Paul Gonnod - engineer
Chris Potter - engineer
Howie Weinberg - mastering
Tim Young - mastering
Nick Knight - photography
Paul Hetherington - graphic design, art direction, design
Howard Wakefield - graphic design

References

2003 albums
Marianne Faithfull albums
Albums produced by David A. Stewart